Julie Hayes (born 2 May 1973 in Ryde, Sydney) is an Australian former cricket player.

Hayes played 111 Women's National Cricket League matches and two Women's Twenty20 matches for the New South Wales Breakers.

Hayes played six Tests, 59 One Day Internationals and two Women's Twenty20 Internationals for the Australia national cricket team. She was the 140th women to play Test Cricket for Australia.

Hayes took the deciding wicket in a bowl-out in the first Women's Twenty20 International played in Australia, when the Australian women played the New Zealand at the Allan Border Field on 18 October 2006.

References

1973 births
Australia women One Day International cricketers
Australia women Test cricketers
Australia women Twenty20 International cricketers
Living people
New South Wales Breakers cricketers
Cricketers from Sydney
Sportswomen from New South Wales